Abdallat–Davis–Farrage syndrome is a form of phakomatosis, a disease of the central nervous system accompanied by skin abnormalities. It is characterized by the out of the ordinary pigment of the skin that is abnormal to one's genetics or the color perceived on a basis.

The condition is named after the team of medical professionals who first wrote it up, describing the appearance of the syndrome in a family from Jordan. It was characterized in 1980 by Adnan Abdallat, a Jordanian doctor.

Signs and symptoms 
Clinical presentation is as follows:
 Albinism (hair)
 Irregular decreased skin pigmentation
 Excessive freckling
 Insensitivity to pain
 Paraparesis/quadraparesis

Genetics
The syndrome is thought to be inherited as an autosomal recessive genetic trait, meaning that in order to manifest symptoms, a person must inherit a gene for Abdallat–Davis–Farrage syndrome from both parents. As it is also autosomal (not linked to either of the genes that determine gender), it can manifest in both men and women. Those with only one gene are carriers, and they typically manifest no symptoms; in the event that a person inherits both genes, symptoms usually appear before one year of age.

Treatment

References

External links 

Autosomal recessive disorders
Syndromes affecting the skin
Genetic disorders with OMIM but no gene
Syndromes affecting the nervous system
Diseases named for discoverer